The Robert Fulton Houses is a housing project located in the Chelsea neighborhood in the New York City Borough of Manhattan and is owned and operated by the New York City Housing Authority (NYCHA). The  site is located between West 16th and 19th Streets and bounded by Ninth and Tenth Avenues. The project consists of 945 apartments in eleven buildings; three of the developments are 25 stories, while the others are 6 stories high.

History 
The Robert Fulton Houses were designed by architects Brown & Guenther and were developed as a "vest pocket" site that retains the street grid. The groundbreaking ceremony was held on October 15, 1962 and the buildings were completed on March 31, 1965. Its confines are within the 10th Police Precinct.

The housing project is named after engineer and inventor Robert Fulton (1765-1815).

Due to financial needs of the NYCHA, the de Blasio administration began putting plans together to begin working with private developers in 2019. Fulton Houses is located in a rapidly gentrifying neighborhood where median asking rent is $3,462. The plan proposed by the city includes demolishing and rebuilding two buildings and a parking garage in the housing project and replacing them with three larger buildings that 70 percent would be market-rate, and 30 percent would be “affordable enough” for current residents; and to turn over management to a private developer. Residents of the project do not have any input in land-use decisions, and residents are organizing in opposition noting that previous conversions of public housing came with a 57 percent rent increase. Average monthly rent for residents is $660.

Notable people 

 Shawn Wayans (born 1971), actor
 Marlon Wayans (born 1972), actor and comedian

See also
New York City Housing Authority
List of New York City Housing Authority properties

Notes

Residential buildings in Manhattan
Public housing in Manhattan
Residential buildings completed in 1965
Chelsea, Manhattan